Dhaka Chamber of Commerce & Industry (DCCI), established in 1958, is a large organization for businesspeople in Dhaka, Bangladesh.

History 
Dhaka Muslim Chamber of Commerce and Industry (1936) and the United Chamber of Commerce and Industry (1947) merged in 1959 to form the Dhaka Chamber of Commerce and Industry.

International affiliations
DCCI has affiliations with various international organizations like UNDP, UNCTAD, WTO, ITC, ESCAP, UNIDO, USAID, CBI, World Bank, ICC, GTZ, JICA, ZDH, APO, IFC-BICF, JETRO, CIPE, SEDF, WCC, CCPIT.

DCCI Business Institute (DBI)
DCCI established a business institute named "DCCI Business Institute" (DBI) in 1999. DBI is fully controlled by a research-oriented professional body.

See also
 Chittagong Chamber of Commerce & Industry
 Khulna Chamber of Commerce & Industry

References

https://thefinancialexpress.com.bd/trade/rizwan-rahman-to-lead-dcci-as-new-president-1609240082

External links
 Office of Dhaka Chamber of Commerce & Industry (DCCI)
 
 
 
 
 
 
 
 
 
 

Chambers of commerce in Bangladesh
Business organisations based in Bangladesh
Economy of Dhaka
Chambers of commerce
1959 establishments in East Pakistan